The AAAI/ACM Conference on AI, Ethics, and Society (AIES) is a peer-reviewed academic conference series focused on societal and ethical aspects of artificial intelligence. The conference is jointly organized by the Association for Computing Machinery, namely the Special Interest Group on Artificial Intelligence (SIGAI), and the Association for the Advancement of Artificial Intelligence. The conference community includes lawyers, practitioners, and academics in computer science, philosophy, public policy, economics, human-computer interaction, and more.

As of 2022, the conference is sponsored by the National Science Foundation as well as various large technology companies including Google, DeepMind, Meta, and IBM Research.

List of conferences
Past and future AIES conferences include:

See also
 Ethics of artificial intelligence
 Philosophy of artificial intelligence
 Regulation of artificial intelligence

References

External links
 
 Proceedings
 

Computer science conferences
Association for Computing Machinery conferences
Association for the Advancement of Artificial Intelligence
Philosophy events
Recurring events established in 2018
Ethics organizations